The 1995 St Albans City and District Council election took place on 4 May 1995 to elect members of St Albans City and District Council in England. This was on the same day as other local elections.

Election result

Ward results

Ashley

Batchwood

Clarence

Cunningham

Harpenden East

Harpenden North

Harpenden South

Harpenden West

London Colney

Marshallwick North

Marshallwick South

 
 

 

No Green candidate as previous (3.2%).

Park Street

Redbourn

 
 

 

No Independent candidate as previous (18.8%).

Sandridge

Sopwell

St. Peters

 
 

 

No Green candidate as previous (3.8%).

St. Stephens

Verulam

 
 
 

 

No Green candidate as previous (4.2%).

Wheathampstead

References

1995 English local elections
1995
May 1995 events in the United Kingdom